Appuram Bengal Ippuram Thiruvithamkoor is a 2016 Indian Malayalam-language romantic-comedy drama film directed by Sennan Pallassery. The film stars Maqbool Salmaan, Ansiba Hassan, Shammi Thilakan, Captain Raju and Poojitha Menon in the lead roles. Prasad Mylakkattu produced the film under the banner of Mylakkattu Films. The film was released on 4 March 2016.

Premise 
A Bengali family comes to Kerala and starts living in a portion of a rented house shared by Shibi, a painter and artist, Ambros, an auto driver and Josappen, a cook. The happy life of the three friends is thus interrupted by the arrival of Bengali family.

Cast 
 Maqbool Salmaan - Sibi
 Unni Rajan P Dev  - Ambroose
 Rajeev Rajan - Joppan
 Nizzar Kodinji - Kumar
 Charulatha - Devayani
 Ansiba Hassan - Saajitha
 Shammi Thilakan - Pastor.Thankachen
 Sunil Sukhada - Suresh Gopi
 Hareesh Perumanna
 Poojitha Menon - Shilpa
 Idavela Babu -  Socilist mathachen
 Saju Navodaya - Shibu
 Minon - Anthappan
 Sasi Kalinga - Keeru Paappan
 Pradeep Kottayam
 P. Balachandran - Nambeeshan
 Gourav Menon - Babukuttan
 Lakshmi Priya - Lizy
 Sruthi Madhavan
 Indian Babu
 Captain Raju
 Manivarnan

Music 

The soundtrack album for the film was composed by Jassie Gift with lyrics written by B.K. Harinarayanan.

References

External links 
 
 
 Theatres

2010s Malayalam-language films
2016 films
2016 comedy-drama films
Indian comedy-drama films